"Pallache" – also de Palacio(s), Palache, Palaçi, Palachi, Palacci, Palaggi, and many other variations (documented below) – is the surname of a prominent, Ladino-speaking, Sephardic Jewish family from the Iberian Peninsula, who spread mostly through the Mediterranean after the Alhambra Decree of March 31, 1492, and related events.

The Pallache family have had connections with Moroccans, Spanish, Netherlands and Portuguese Sephardic Jewish communities, as detailed below.

The Pallaches established themselves in cities in Morocco, the Netherlands, Turkey, Egypt, and other countries from the 1500s through the 1900s. The family includes chief rabbis, rabbis, founders of synagogues and batei midrash, scientists, entrepreneurs, writers, and others. Best known to date are: Moroccan envoys and brothers Samuel Pallache (ca. 1550–1616) and Joseph Pallache, at least three grand rabbis of Izmir – Gaon. Haim Palachi (1788–1868), his sons Abraham Palacci (1809–1899) and Rahamim Nissim Palacci (1814–1907), grand rabbi of Amsterdam Isaac Juda Palache (1858–1927), American mineralogist Charles Palache (1869–1954), and Dutch linguist Juda Lion Palache (1886–1944).

History

Inquisitions and expulsions

According to historians Mercedes García-Arenal and Gerard Wiegers, "Les Pallache étaient une famille de juifs d'origine hispanique installés à Fès depuis l'expulsion des juifs d'Espagne en 1492." ("The Pallaches were a family of Hispanic Jews who settled in Fez after the Jews were expelled from Spain in 1492.")

In 1480, Queen Isabella I of Castile and King Ferdinand II of Aragon established a Tribunal of the Holy Office of the Inquisition, commonly known as the Spanish Inquisition (Inquisición española). Its dual purpose was to maintain Catholic orthodoxy in Spain while replacing the Medieval Inquisition under papal control. On March 31, 1492, Isabella and Ferdinand issued the Alhambra Decree (or "Edict of Expulsion"), thereby ordering the expulsion of practicing Jews from the Kingdoms of Castile and Aragon, its territories, and it possessions by July 31 that year–in four months. Jews who had converted to Christianity ("conversos") were safe from expulsion. Some 200,000 Jews converted; between 40,000 and 100,000 fled from the kingdom.   (On December 16, 1968, Spain revoked the Alhambra Edict. On June 25, 2015, King Felipe VI of Spain announced Law Number 12/2015, which grants right of return to Sephardic Jews. There are criticisms about shortcomings in the law. By October 2016, Spain had processed more than 4,500 applicants, of which only three had gained citizenship based on the actual law: the rest (number unstated) were naturalized by royal decree.")

On December 5, 1496, King ManueI of Portugal decreed that all Jews must convert to Catholicism or leave the country. Jews who converted to Christianity were known as New Christians. This initial edict of expulsion turned into an edict of forced conversion by 1497. In 1506, the Lisbon Massacre erupted. In 1535, Portugal launched its own inquisition. Portuguese Jews fled to the Ottoman Empire (notably Thessaloniki and Istanbul and to Morocco. Some went to Amsterdam, France, Brazil, Curaçao, and the Antilles. Some of the most famous descendants of Portuguese Jews who lived outside Portugal are the philosopher Baruch Spinoza (from Portuguese Bento de Espinosa), and the classical economist David Ricardo. While Portugal was under control of the Philippine Dynasty of the House of Habsburg (1581–1640), the Portuguese Inquisition blended with the Spanish.

The combined Spanish-Portuguese inquisitions caused one of the largest diasporas in Jewish history.

Iberia

(Research is currently underway to connect the Pallache more clearly back from Morocco to the Iberian Peninsula and probable ancestor, Samuel ben Meir Ha-Levi Abulafia / Samuel ha-Levi (ca. 1320–1360) of Cordoba, Andalusia, which would make the Pallache family a branch of the Abulafia family.)

According to Professor Mercedes García-Arenal, the Pallaches were "a Sephardi family perhaps descended from the Bene Palyāj mentioned by the twelfth-century chronicler Abraham Ibn Da’ud as 'the greatest of the families of Córdoba'".

According to Professor Reginald Aldworth Daly, the Pallaches were "persecuted Sephardim Jews of Portugal who were exiled to Holland".

According to Professor Giovanna Fiume, "Verso i Paesi Bassi emigra anche la famiglia Pallache, forse dal Portogallo o dalla Spagna, oppure, secundo un'altra ipotesti, dalla nativa Spagna emigra a Fez." (translation: "The Pallache family also emigrated to the Netherlands, perhaps from Portugal or Spain, or, second, another hypothesizes, they emigrated [directly] from their native Spain to Fez.")

José Maria Abecassis cites historian Abraham ibn Daud of Toledo (ca. 1110–1180), who wrote:    Segundo o historiador Abraham Ben Daud (Sepher Ha-Qabbalah, 69) a família Pallache já era célebre em Córdova no séc. 10. Após a expulsão de Espanha em 1492 foi para Marrocos, donde posteriormente se ramificou na Holanda, Turquia, Palestina e em Gibraltar.Outras grafias: Palatio, Pallacío, Payachia. Membros desta familia prestaram serviços eminentes a Marrocos no séc. 17. Distinguiram-se como embaixadores ou enviados dos sultões na Europa, especialmente na Holanda. Estabeleceram relações diplomáticas e criaram importantes trocas comerciais com o seu país.Os Palaçano viviam em Portugal antes da Expulsão.  According to the historian Abraham Ben Daud (Sepher Ha-Qabbalah, 69) the Pallache family was already famous in Cordoba in the 10th century. After expulsion from Spain in 1492, they went to Morocco, where later they branched out to Holland, Turkey, Palestine, and Gibraltar. Other spellings: Palatio, Pallacío, Payachia. Members of this family provided eminent services to Morocco in the 17th century. They distinguished themselves as ambassadors or envoys of the Sultans in Europe, especially in Holland. They established diplomatic relations and created important trade with their country.The Palaçano lived in Portugal before the Expulsion.

Morocco

     Jewish presence in Morocco goes back to Carthage, fared moderately, and often prospered under Muslim rule (e.g., the Marinid dynasty). From Morocco, they filtered into Al-Andalus (Islamic Spain, 711–1492) but began to return during the Spanish Reconquista, which mounted in the 10th century. The Spanish-Portuguese expulsions and inquisitions sent floods of Jews back to Morocco on a larger scale. Resultant overcrowding in Moroccan cities led to tension, fires, and famines in Jewish quarters.

Moïse Al Palas (also Moses al-Palas) (???–1535), born in Marrakesh, was a rabbi who moved to Tetuán and lived for a time in Salonica, then in the Ottoman Empire. Before dying in Venice, he published Va-Yakhel Moshe (1597) and Ho'il Moshe (1597), and an autobiography.

Isaac Pallache was a rabbi in Fez, Morocco, first mentioned in takkanot (Jewish community statutes) in 1588. His sons were Samuel Pallache (ca. 1550–1616) and Joseph Pallache. Isaac was married to a sister of Fez's grand rabbi, Judah Uziel; his nephew Isaac Uziel became a rabbi of the Neve Shalom community in Amsterdam.

Netherlands

  Jews began to settle in the Netherlands only at the end of the 16th century. Thanks to its own recent (1581) independence from Spanish control, the Dutch Republic attracted Sephardic Jews in the Netherlands as a refuge from a common enemy, Spain.

After an unsuccessful attempt to return to Spain in the mid-1600s, Samuel and Joseph Pallache settled a new branch of the Pallache family in the Netherlands by 1608. There, they represented their benefactor, Zidan al-Nasir of Morocco, as well as the Dutch government, in complex negotiations with Morocco, the Netherlands, Spain, France, England, the Ottoman Empire, and other European states – often on behalf of more than one sponsoring state and (as stateless Jews) on their own behalf.

The sons of both brothers continued in their fathers's footsteps, some remaining in the Netherlands (e.g., David Pallache), others returning to Morocco (e.g., Moses Pallache).

In the Netherlands, the surname solidified as "Palache" (a spelling variation which started in the 16th century), and the family continues as Palache in the Netherlands to the present. In recent times, prominent members have included grand rabbi Isaac Juda Palache (1858–1927) and his son, Professor Juda Lion Palache (1887–1944).

A Man in Three Worlds did not find intermarriage between the Pallache brothers or sons and members of the Portuguese Sephardic community in the Netherlands. In fact, it documents the contrary, e.g., that sons Isaac and Joshuae did not go make such marriages. "It seems significant that no male member of the Pallache family ever married a woman from the Portuguese community... it is surely significant that neither Samuel nor any of his heirs were ever to marry into the great trading families of 'the Portuguese nation'." In September 2016, however, two 1643 marriage certificates were discovered for David Pallache (1598–1650) and Judith Lindo (??? – October 30, 1665) of Antwerp, daughter of Ester Lindo Death details for David Pallache also confirm the marriage. Further, three years later, in 1646, Samuel Pallache (1616–???), son of Isaac Joseph Pallache and nephew of David Joseph Pallache, married Abigail (born 1622), sister of Judith Lindo.

Portugal

At present, it is unclear as to whether members of the Pallache family went first to Portugal after Spain. However, new findings show that their intermarriage started earlier than supposed in A Man in Three Worlds (see "Netherlands," above).

Turkey
      
Jews have lived in Asia Minor (Turkey) since the 5th century BCE. The Ottoman Empire welcomed Sephardic Jews expelled from the Iberian Peninsula. Today, the majority of Turkish Jews live in Israel, while modern-day Turkey continues to host a modest Jewish population.

The first reported Pallache in Turkey (then, the Ottoman Empire) dates to 1695, when Isaac Pallache of Leghorn (Livorno, Italy) wrote a letter to the Dutch consul in Smyrna (1695) Currently, it is unknown whether the Pallache settled first in Istanbul or Izmir.

The Pallache appear in Izmir (then, "Smyrna") no later than the time of rabbi Jacob Pallache, who married the daughter of a previous grand rabbi Joseph Raphael ben Hayyim Hazzan. Jacob's son became grand rabbi Haim Palachi (1788–1868), two of whose sons, Abraham (1809–1899) and Isaac aka Rahamim Nissim (1814–1907) also became grand rabbis there.

According to the Encyclopedia of Jews in the Islamic World:    The Pallache... produced several leading rabbinical scholars in the Ottoman city of Izmir (Smyrna) during the nineteenth and early twentieth centuries. Two of them, Hayyim ben Jacob and his sone Abraham, served as chief rabbi (hakham bashi) and became the focus of a fierce dispute that engulfed the town's Jewish community, while a third, Soloman ben Abraham, contributed to its decline.    In 1863, a London-based Jewish newspaper noted "the chief rabbi of Smyrna, Palacci, a venerable, octogenarian, seems to command universal respect by his truly patriarchal appearance, his countenance reflected the gentleness of his heart." In 1868, Die Deborah (part of The American Israelite) reported a gather of four rabbis who unanimously supported the wish of the late Abraham Palacci that his son (son not named) be appointed in his place. In 1872, the Bulletin de l'Alliance Israélite Universelle reported on a "real famine" for which relief was sent to Chief Rabbi Palacci to distribute. In early 1873, the name of Haim Nissim Palacci appears as treasurer in Smyrna of the Alliance Israélite Universelle (founded 1860). In mid-1873, the "Universal Israelitish Alliance of Paris" and the "Anglo-Jewish Association of London" agreed to establish a school for Jewish boys and girls in Smyrna under the guidance of "Dr. Palacci, Chief Rabbi of Smyrna". In 1891, a newspaper reported the a "good likeness" of chief rabbi Abraham Palacci was on its way from Smyrna to Istanbul as part of books sent there. In 1893, a newspaper reported that the importance of a grand rabbi Palacci (which one, unspecified), aided by his son Nissim Palacci (a commonly used family name).

The Pallache continued in Turkey past the 1922 great fire of Smyrna; some left during Allied evacuation during World War II and were murdered during the Holocaust (see below).

Egypt
   The Torah documents a long history of Jews in Egypt. Jews lived quietly under the Romans until the advent of Christianity (e.g., Emperor Heraclius I and Patriarch Cyrus of Alexandria). After the Arab conquest, Jews survived reasonably well under the Tulunids (863–905), the Fatimids (969–1169), and the Ayyubids (1174–1250) during whose rule Maimonides lived. Under the Bahri Mamluks (1250–1390), Jews began to feel less secure and less so under the Burji Mamluks (1390–1517). The Ottomans (1517–1922) took more active interest in the Jewish community and made substantial changes in their governance. Shabbatai Zvi visited Cairo, where his movement continued under Abraham Miguel Cardozo, physician to the pasha Kara Mohammed. Following the Damascus Affair, Moses Montefiore, Adolphe Crémieux, and Salomon Munk visited Egypt in 1840 and helped found schools with Rabbi Moses Joseph Algazi.

It was a period of rapid change in Egypt. As of 1867, the government began changing from pasha to khedive, to sultan and threw off Ottoman suzerainty. It also saw the building of the Suez Canal. Political unrest exploded after World War I, led by Saad Zaghlul and the Wafd Party) and culminating in the Egyptian revolution of 1919 and the issue by the UK government (colonial controllers in the 1800s) of a unilateral declaration of Egyptian independence on February 22, 1922.. (See History of Egypt under the British.) The new Egyptian government drafted and implemented a constitution in 1923 based on a parliamentary system. In 1924, Zaghlul became Prime Minister of Egypt. In 1936, Egypt concluded a new treaty with the UK. In 1952, the 1952 Revolution of the Free Officers Movement forced King Farouk to abdicate in support of his son Fuad, secured a British promise of withdrawal by 1954–1956, and led to the accession of Egypt's first modern president Gamal Abdel-Nasser.

No later than the close of the 19th century, a branch of the Pallache family had settled in Egypt, with some remaining in Cairo into the 1950s.

Which members of the family had what foreign citizenship is as yet undetermined, e.g., Spanish under the Decree-Law of 29 December 1948 (Decreto-Ley de 29 de Deciembre de 1948) to extend Spanish protection for Sephardic Jews in Greece and Egypt:    DECRETO-LEY de 29 de diciembre de 1948 por el que se reconoce la condición de súbditos españoles en 1. extranjero a determinados sefardies protegidos de España:   Por Canje de Notas efectuado por España con Egipto el dieciséis y diecisiete de enero de mil novecientos treinta y cinco, y con Grecia el siete de abril de mil novecientos treinta y seis, se convino que España continuarla otorgando su patrocinio y documentando, en consecuencia, a una serie de familias sefardies que, desde tiempos del imperIo ottoman, gozaban en aquellos territorios de tal gracia; y a dicho efecto, y como anejo a las referidas Notas, se establecireron unas listas, cuidadosamente seleccionadas, de esos beneficiarios, cuya futura condición de súbditos españoles se preveía en aquellas Notas...
(Legislative Decree of 29 December 1948 on the condition recognized Spanish subjects in certain Sephardim abroad 1. protected from Spain: Exchange of Notes effected by Spain with Egypt the sixteenth and seventeenth of January in 1935, and Greece on the seventh of April in 1936, it was agreed that Spain continue it by providing sponsorship and documenting, consequently, a number of Sephardic families from the Ottoman Empire times, enjoyed in the territories of such grace; and for this purpose, and as annexed to these notes, few, carefully selected lists of those beneficiaries, whose future status of Spanish subjects envisaged in those Notes were established...)    (Neither "Palacci" nor variations on the surname appear in either the Egyptian or Greek lists.)

Palacci department store

In 1897, Palacci brothers Vita, Henri, and family established the "Palacci" (Arabic Balaatshi) department store. In 1904, the company's name was "Palacci Menasce et Fils". Shortly thereafter, it had become "Palacci Fils, Haim et Cie", located on Muski street near the old Opera House. By 1907, Vita Palacci had become head of the store. Also in 1907, newspapers mentions "Mr. Vita Pallacci, the distinguished chief of the house of Palacci Pils, Halm and Co., which is well known in Europe and America" as president of the "Ahemia Society," and again in 1908 By 1909, the Palacci had partnered with A. Hayam, and the store employed 20 office clerks and more than 100–120 sales staff. In 1910, "Albert Palacci & Co." appears as a Cairo firm interested in trading in silk. At an unclear date, "Palacci, Menasce & Co." are recorded as having stores in Cairo, Tanta, and Mansoura.

In 1916, "Palacci, Fils, Haym, and Co." were listed among "persons who have been granted licenses to trade in Egypt, with the British Empire, and with Allies of Great Britain". The same year, "Palacci Fil, Haim & Co." filed a suit against "Mohamed Moh. Sélim".

When Vita died in 1917, his oldest son Albert Vita Palacci succeeded as manager. The store had offices overseas in Paris (1922) to purchase draperies and hardware, while its Cairo offices exported household essentials and perfumes. By the mid-1920s, Palacci had branches on Fuad Street and in Heliopolis.

In 1925, the Palacci partook in a "Gran Corso Carnivalesque" in Cairo, organized by the International Union of Commercial Establishment Employees of Cairo, along with 24 other grand department stores, including: Cicurel,Bon Marché, Mawardi, Salamander, and Paul Favre. Other department stores of that time included: Chemla Frères (see Jacqueline Kahanoff), Orosdi-Back, Sednaoui (see Elisa Sednaoui), Hannaux, Chalons, Ades (see Ades Synagogue and Yaakov Ades), Gattegno (see Caleb Gattegno and Joseph Gattegno), Madkur, Ahmad, Yusuf Gamal, Benzion (see owner Moïse Lévy de Benzion and Levi de Benzion), Morum's, Stein's, Raff's, Robert Hughes, Mayer, Tiring. The history Maadi: 1904–1962 lists the following Jewish families around the Adly synagogue including: Rasson, Romano, Gold, Kabili, Rofe, Mizrahi, Chalem, Calderon, Agami, setton, Simhon, Sofeir. It also lists those Jewish families close by, including: Harris, Risolevi, Hettena, Sullam, Ades, Watoury, Palacci, Curiel, Basri, Farhi, Hazan, and Hazan. The history Egypt: The Lost Homeland lists the following Jewish families in Cairo who "were considered Austrian and enjoyed the protection of the Austrian embassy, event though they were not Austrian citizens": Adda, Benarojo, Belilios, Cattaui, Forte, Goldstein, Heffez, Ismalun, Mondolfo, Pallaci, Picciotto, Rossano, and Romano.

In the 1920s, the store advertised in newspapers, e.g.,  ("Visit Palacci, Haym & Co. – Mousky – Considerable discounts at all counters. Enjoy!"). Price defying all competition."). Sale on credit. Payment facilities. Same price in cash"). By November 1926, advertisements added a new location in Heliopolis in its next advertisement,  ("On credit. Shop at Palacci, Haym & Co. Mousky-Heliopolis. Credit sale. Payment facilities. Same price as in cash"). Palacci, Haym & Co. Mousky. Heliopolis. Before furnishing your Apartment, visit the Furniture section. Credit sales – Payment facilities"). In mid-1927, the advertisement tried  ("Now at Palacci, Him & Co., Mousky. Display of travel and sea-bathing items at very favorable prices. Visit us"). Palacci, Haym & Co., Mousky – Heliopolis. The largest stores specializing in Furniture sales. Unbeatable Prices – Payment Facilities"). In September 1928, it began to advertise only as "Palacci" and dropped Heliopolis as its second location but restored a more French version "Palacci Haym & Cie" as well as the second store in Heliopolis (alternate version "Palacci Haim & Cie.") in the first quarter of 1929, reverting again to "Palacci Haym & Co." In 1930, Palacci added mention of its catalog, by which times its ads began to place on pages 5, 6 and even 9 of newspapers while settling largely on "Palacci" again on pages 3 and finished 1930 and starting 1931 on page 2. In 1932, Palacci first used an image with its ads, which faces on furniture and beds.

In 1933, the family of Mahmoud Abel Bak El Bitar had a lawsuit against "Pallaci, Haym & Co." By 1935, the Palacci department store had experienced financial difficulties.

In August 1937, the original department store of les "Grand Magasins" Palacci, Haym & Co. on Mouski Street burned; the family did not rebuild.  newspaper of Cairo reported:

All the friends, all the clients of MM. Palacci Haym & Co. learned with infinite regret of the fire in their Mousky department store last Thursday evening. We read the details of this incident in the daily press and will not come back to it. Suffice it to say here that it is with friendly emotion and sincere sympathy that we learned of the hard ordeal endured by our excellent friends and co-religionists Albert Palacci and Albert Haym, whose dedication and tireless work for more than thirty years in this corner of Mousky at the head of their House are known to all so advantageously. We reiterate our sincere regrets to them and send them our best wishes. Mrs. Palacci, Haym and Co., extend their sincere thanks to all their friends, suppliers and customers for the great friendship and sympathy shown to them following the hard ordeal they have just suffered. They inform their customers, the Commissionaires, and their suppliers that they have established a provisional office in the Liepmann building, above the Hamzaoui post office. All correspondence should be addressed to P.O. Box 371, Cairo.

– Advertisements for the Palacci department store vanish from newspapers.

The family company or derivatives continued. In 1938, an Elie Palacci started advertising in Alexandria:  ("Shop at Elie Palacci, food depots. 13, Boulevard Saïd 1er. Phone 254-17"). In 1947, an ad for "La Maison A. V. Palacci & Co." in the Hamzaoui section of Cairo appeared, as did an "H.M. Palacci & Co." as an agent of the G. R. Marshall & Co. exporting company of Richmond, Canada. The 1948 Cairo bombings, which included the Ades and Gattegno stores, did not deter the family; both Albert Vita Palacci and Dr. Victor Palacci appear in a 1955 Who's Who for Egypt, while Henry Menahem Palacci in Cairo appears in the mid-1950s (along with an Albert Palacci in Belgium). By the time Nasser had nationalized all Jewish-owned assets in Egypt (1958), most Palacci had left Cairo in diaspora–yet "Palacci Fils, Hayem et Cie." remained listed as a business in Cairo as late as 1959.

Ahemia Society
As community leaders, the Palacci supported Jewish causes inside and outside Egypt. In 1907, Vita Palacci was serving as president of la société de bienfaisence a "Hachemia" (from Hebrew Hakham: הכם ḥaḵam, "wise"?):

In 1901, a Jewish mutual aid society was founded in Cairo called the "Hachemia." This institution, which is a charitable organization for Turkish [Ottoman] Jews residing in Egypt, is making positive advances. Since the last fiscal year, Hachemia has provided medical care to a thousand visiting patients at the rate of one piaster (0.25 French francs) per visit, not including patients cared for and covered by Hachemia in several hospitals in Cairo and Alexandria...Last year, Baron Edmond de Rothschild, during his last visit to Cairo, donated 3,000 francs. In 1901, Baroness de Rothschild made a gift in the same amount.The committee leadership of Hachemia is composed of prominent people of Cairo. Mr. Vita Palacci, the distinguished head of the major commercial house Palacci Sons, Haim and Co., well known in Egypt and in Sudan, is the current and committed president of Hachemia. Among the other members of the leadership are: Dr. Beneroya, the editor of the newspaper "La Vara"; Mr. Talvi, an engineer at the Ministry of Public Works, etc.; Dr. Amster, doctor administering health services; and Dr. Isaac J. Levy of Alexandria, doctor at the Jewish Community Menascé Hospital, of Anti-Tuberculosis League, and the Alexandria Municipality. The latter two are honorary members theoretically, actively, and practically.

During 1916–1917, "Palacci Fils, Haym & Co." was one of numerous donors in Egypt to the "Yeshibat Erez Israel (Rabbinical Institution) for the Refugee Rabbis from the Holy Land, established by the Alexandrian Rabbinate." From 1 Year 5676 through Sivan 5677 (4 April 1916 through to 29 June 1917), this group collected 120,427.5 PT (piasters), routed to its treasurer, E. Anzurat and published its third financial report. Donors were from Alexandria, Cairo, "suburbs," England, Australia, Canada, S. Africa, India, France, and the USA. The local collector in Cairo was Rabbi Haim Mendelof. The Palacci donated 500 PT, as did Maurice Calamari, I.M. Cattaui & Fils, Le Fils de M. Cicurel, Jaques & Elie Green.

Cairo residences

The Pallache family settled around the main home of Vita Palacci, a villa ("Palacci-Naggar-Ades Building") at No. 23 Ahmed Basha Street (Ahmad Pasha Street) in Garden City, Cairo. Two of Vita Palacci's grandchildren, siblings Eddy and Colette, have written memoirs of their childhoods in Cairo (and Paris), which document Sephardic Jewish life in Cairo in the 1930s, including traditions, use of Ladino, and food recipes.

Alexandria

Pallache also settled in Alexandria. "Mordahai Palacci-Miram was likewise a Sephardi but from Constantinople, when he married Rosa Alterman, an Ashkenazi of German origin. Several of their children were born in Constantinople... but to escape an outbreak of plague came to Alexandria..." A "Ventura Palacci-Miram" is also mentioned.

Congo venture: La Coupole

After World War I, participation of the Force Publique in the East African campaign resulted in a League of Nations mandate over the previously German colony of Ruanda-Urundi to Belgium as Belgian Congo.

In the mid-1940s, Henri Palacci, son of Menahem, son of Aaron (Henri) Palacci, founded "La Coupole" store in Kinshasa, Democratic Republic of the Congo (then Leopoldville, Belgian Congo), as documented here:    Les commerçants juifs ont contribué à l'émancipation des "indigènes," en les initiant aux produits manufacturés. Ainsi, les boutiques "Au Chic" du Groupe Hasson et "La Coupole" d’Henri Palacci, ouverts, à Léopoldville, vers 1946, vendent à tous et refusent toute forme de discrimination raciale. Leurs rapports quotidiens avec les colonisés distinguaient les Juifs des autres Blancs. Et lors des évènements tragiques de 1960, aucun Juif ne fut molesté par la foule en colère.  
Jewish merchants contributed to the empowerment of "indigenous" people by introducing them to manufactured goods. The shops "Au Chic" (Hasson Group) and "La Coupole" (Henry Palacci), opened in Leopoldville, around 1946, selling to all and refusing any form of racial discrimination. Daily contact with colonized Jews differed from other Whites. And during the tragic events of 1960, no Jew was molested by mobs.    (See "Congo Crisis" for more on the emergence of the DR Congo.)

Other countries

The Pallache had established themselves in Jamaica by the 19th century in the sugar trade. In 1825, the London Gazette posted notice of a partnership that included Mordecai Palache and Alexander Palache "of Kingston, in the Island of Jamaica." A "Charles, son of Mordechai Palache" is recorded in 1847. Numerous people named Palache continued to appear. Most prominent among them was the Honorable John Thomson Palache ("a coloured solicitor").

By 1855, a "Vita Palacci" appears in Argentina.

In 1911, Camille Palacci, daughter of the late Aaron Palacci of Cairo, married Benjamin Bigio in a synagogue on Mauldeth Road in Manchester, United Kingdom.

21st century

Continued expulsions and diaspora have dispersed the Pallache family to many countries in the Americas, Europe, and farther afield.

By the 20th century, the Pallache had established and the United States. The family of noted American mineralogist Charles Palache (1869–1954) came to California from Jamaica. His descendants include Judith Palache Gregory (1932–2017), aka "an American writer, counselor, educator, and permaculturalist".

Numerous Palacci came to the States in diaspora from Turkey and Egypt, including Colette (Palacci) Rossant.

Synagogues

Netherlands
Samuel Pallache may have helped found the first synagogue in Amsterdam. As early as his 1769 Memorias do Estabelecimento e Progresso dos Judeos Portuguezes e Espanhoes nesta Famosa Cidade de Amsterdam, David Franco Mendes records a first minyan in Amsterdam with sixteen worshippers, including Samuel and Joseph Pallache. Other sources go further to claim that this first minyan occurred in Palache's home, as they were dignitaries (envoys from Morocco) and occurred around 1590 or Yom Kippur 1596. However, in their book A Man of Three Worlds on Samuel Pallache, Professors García-Arenal and Gerard A. Wiegers point out that the Pallache brothers arrived in Amsterdam in the first decade of the following century.

Turkey
Around 1840, the Pallache home in Smyrna became today's Beth Hillel Synagogue (Turkish Bet-Ilel Sinagogu) and seat of a yeshiva or beit madras. The synagogue lies in the Kemeraltı marketplace district in Izmir and is named after Haim or Abraham Palacci. Professor Stanford J. Shaw stated it was Haim who founded the Beth Hillel Palacci or his son Abraham. According to Jewish Izmir Heritage, "In the 19th century, Rabbi Avraham Palache founded in his home a synagogue named Beit Hillel, after the philanthropist from Bucharest who supported the publication of Rabbi Palache's books. However, the name 'Avraham Palache Synagogue' was also used by the community." This synagogue forms a cluster of eight extant (from a recorded peak of 34 in the 19th century), all adjacent... [making] Izmir is the only city in the world in which an unusual cluster of synagogues bearing a typical medieval Spanish architectural style is preserved ...[and] creating an historical architectural complex unique in the world." The Zalman Shazar Center also refers to Beit Hillel synagogue as "Avraham Palaggi's synagogue" but then states that "the synagogue was founded by Palaggi Family in 1840" and that Rav Avraham Palaggi "used" it. "The building had been used as a synagogue and a Beit Midrash. The synagogue has not been used since 1960's."    It concludes, "The synagogue was founded by the Palaggi family and is therefore very important."

Egypt

The Palaccis were one of many families that helped maintain the Sephardic Sha'ar Hashamayim Synagogue (Cairo) on Adly Street in downtown Cairo.

Yeshivas

Turkey

Journey into Jewish Heritage states that Haim Palacci founded the Beit Hillel Yeshiva in Izmir in the middle of the 19th century. Current sources are unclear, but it is likely the same as the Beit Midrash mentioned above.

Israel

A seminary was named in Haim Palachi's honor in Bnei Brak, Israel.

Writings
 Haim Palachi – of 82 publications, 36 (as of September 2016) are listed under: Haim Palachi
 Many other rabbinical works by other Palache rabbis, including: Abraham Palacci, Rahamim Nissim Palacci, and Joseph Palacci
 Colette (Palacci) Rossant: Apricots on the Nile (1999, 2004)
 Eddy Palacci: Des étoiles par cœur (2012)

Documented spellings of surname

As the Pallache settled in new cities with new languages, spellings of the surname changed. Sometimes, the families themselves voluntarily changed their surnames while at other times changes occurred via officialdom. In the 20th century, Turkish officials forced all nationals to adopt surnames under the 1934 Surname Law.

Variations on the Pallache name appear on both Spanish and Portuguese lists of Sephardic names. For instance, "Palacci" is listed as Spanish Sephardic, while "Pallache" is listed as Portuguese Sephardic.

Samuel Pallache's name appeared in several forms–including variations that he himself used. A German Vierteljarhschrift mentions both "Duarte de Palacios" and "Duarte Palache" when referring to the same person, thus making direct equation between the names "de Palacios" and "Palache."

Documented names include:
 Pallache'
 Palache (e.g., Samuel Pallache's death certificate) (as Portuguese)
 Palacio
 Pallacío
 de Palacios and Palacios ("Clara Palacios, dochter van J[aco]b de Palacios... een dochter van Jacob de Palacios")
 Palacio 
 Palatio
 Palachio
 Palazzo."
 de Palatio
 al-Palas 
 Pallas 
 Palaggi (as Portuguese)
 Balyash
 Palacci
 Palate,  
 Palatie, 
 Paliache 
 Palachi as in "Haim Palachi" or "Hayim Palachi" 
 Paligi
 Palagi (for Haim Palachi as "Chaim Palagi)
 Palatchi (in Turkey)
 Bene Palyāj (mentioned by the twelfth-century chronicler Abraham Ibn Da’ud as "the greatest of the families of Córdoba")
 Palyaji
 Ibn Falija
 Falaji
 Palaji
 Faleseu (Semuel Palache, buried July 4, 1717)
 Palachy
 Palaci
 Payache (used by David Payache in 1649 and Semuel Payache in 1677)
 Payaxe (used by David Payaxe aka David Payache aka David Pal[l]ache in the 1600s)
 Payachia
 Pallachi
 Pelache
 Palatchie (Australia/New Zealand)

Family tree

The approach that the outline below follows is: 1) use Moïse Rahmani's essay "Les Patronymes: une histoire de nom ou histoire tout court" as a base, 2) add findings from the penultimate chapter of García-Arenal and Wiegers's A Man of Three Worlds: Samuel Pallache, a Moroccan Jew in Catholic and Protestant Europe (1999, 2007), and 3) add further information – all with citations. The index developed for Abraham Galante's Jews of Turkey is another major source for the Izmir branch of the family.

 16th–17th Centuries Morocco and Netherlands 
Pallache of the 16th–17th Centuries, who originated from Morocco include:
 Moïse Al Palas (???–1535), born in Marrakesh, lived in Salonica, died in Venice
 Isaac Pallache(???–1560), rabbi of Fez (mentioned 1588)
  Isaac Uziel (???-1622), nephew of Isaac Palacche, rabbi of Amsterdam's second Separhdic synagogue "Neve Shalom"
  Samuel Pallache (ca. 1550–1616), envoy and dragoman of Morocco (1608–1616)
   Isaac Palache, co-envoy of Morocco to Poland (1618–1619), consul of the Netherlands to Salé, Morocco
   Jacob Palache ("Carlos"), envoy of Morocco to Denmark
  Joseph Pallache (ca.1552-1638/1639/1649), envoy and dragoman of Morocco (1616–1638) 
   Isaac Palache, envoy of Morocco to the Ottoman Sultan, later broker in Amsterdam, later served sultan of Morroc (1647) 
   Samuel Pallache (1616/1618–???), represented his uncle Moses's request to marry levitically the wife of his other uncle David
   Yehoshua Pallache (Joshua), co-envoy of Morocco to Poland (1618–1619), tax collector of Salé, Morocco
   Manasseh ben Samuel (or Menasseh Ben Israel?), helped gain return of Jews to England from Oliver Cromwell (1656, following their expulsion in 1290)
   David Pallache (1598–1650?), envoy of Morocco to King Louis XIII of France (1631–1632), envoy and dragoman of Morocco (1638-1648/1649), and business partner of Michael de Spinoza (father of Baruch Spinoza) 
   Moses Pallache(???–1650), advisor to four sultans of Morocco (1618 to 1650): Muley Zaydan (1603–1627), Muley Abd al-Malik (1623–1627), Muley al-Walid (1631–1636), and Muley Muhammad al-Shakh al-Saghir (1636–1655)
   Abraham Palacci, 17th century merchant (French négocient) to Safi, Morocco

 17th–20th Centuries Netherlands
Pallache (as "Palache") of the 17th–20th Centuries in the Netherlands include:
 Judah Pallache Isaac Juda Palache (Isaac van Juda Palache) (1858–1927), grand rabbi of Amsterdam (1900–1927), bet din from 1885
 Juda Lion Palache (1886–1944), professor of Oriental languages at the University of Amsterdam

17th–20th Centuries Ottoman empire
Pallache of the 17th–20th Centuries in Smyrna / Izmir, Turkey (then Ottoman Empire) include:

 Isaac Pallache of Leghorn (Livorno, Italy) and later Izmir, where he wrote letter to Dutch consul in Smyrna requesting projection for "Salomón Moses" (1695)
 Samuel Palacci, died 1732, "among the most ancient graves in Kuşadası cemetery"
[...]
 Jacob Pallache (ca. 1755–1828), 18th century rabbi
 Isaac Palacci, brother of Haim
  Salomon Palache    Yehoshua Pallache, rabbi of Safed, Israel
  Hayyim Pallache (Palagi) (1788–1869), hakham bachi (1858), grand rabbi and kabbalist, member of Communal Council in Istanbul, died February 9, 1869
  Abraham Palacci (1809–1899), grand rabbi, funded for Beit Hilel yeshiva 1840, chief rabbi 1869, died 1899
   Salomon Palacci, eldest son of Abraham, whose candidacy for grand rabbi failed
   Nissim Palacci, son of Abraham, who supported his brother Salomon for grand rabbi
  Isaac Palacci, son of Haim AKA Rahamim Nissim Palacci (1813–1907), grand rabbi after Haim and Abraham and author of Avot harosh at Isaac Samuel Segura printing house Izmir 1869
 Joseph Palacci (1819–1896), rabbi and author of "Voyoseph Abraham Dito Libro en Ladino for las Ma'alot de Joseph ha-Zaddig" (1881), printed book Yosef et ehav at Mordekhai Isaac Barki printinghouse in Izmir 1896
[...]
 Benjamin Palacci 1890, later rabbi in Tire (a district of Izmir)
 Hilel Palacci, member of Izmir communal council 1929–1933
 Jacob Palacci, director of choir Choeur des Maftirim in Istanbul 19th–20th century
 Nissim Palacci, helped Jewish Hospital Istanbul early 20th century, member of Galata community committee 1928–1931, member Haskeuy community committee 1935–1939

 19th–20th Centuries Egypt
Other Pallache who left Turkey (Izmir or Istanbul) for Egypt include:

 Vita Palacci (ca. 1865–1917), left Izmir for Cairo, co-founded Palacci department store (first "Palacci Menasce et Fils",) then "Palacci Fils, Haim et Clie) (1897")
  Isaac Palacci (1893–1940), Paris-based négocient for Palacci department store
  Eddy Palacci (1931–2016)
  Colette (Palacci) Rossant (living)
  Juliette Rossant (living)
  Clement Palacci (1898–1984), Paris-based architect, real estate developer
 Henri Palacci, brother of Vita, left Izmir for Cairo, traded in chemical products in Egypt and Sudan
  Menahem Palacci, (co-)founded Palacci department store in Cairo, classmate of King Fouad I of Egypt, helped Jews in Egypt become Egyptian citizens (1922)
   Henri Palacci, (1917–???), son of Menahem
   Albert Palacci, "Mrs." listed as "member of Elderly Center Committee in Cairo" (1938)

 17th–20th Centuries elsewhere
Other Pallache of the 17th–20th Centuries in other lands and who are (to date) unclearly connected to Dutch or Turkish/Egyptian branches include:
 Jacob Pallache, 17th century rabbi of Marrakesh and later Egypt, supporter of Sabbatai Tsevi (1626–1676)
 Abraham Pallache, 18th century rabbi of Safed, Israel (then Ottoman empire)
 Abraham Pallache, 19th century rabbi of Tétouan, Morocco, and author in 1837
 Samuel Pallache, 18th century rabbi in the Netherlands (author of Sheroot Be Ekhol u Bet Mishtek, published 1770) 
  Moshe Samuel Palache (???-1859), rabbi in Jerusalem (son of Samuel Pallache above?)
 Palache of Jamaica and USA 
 James Palache (1834–1906)
 Whitney Palache (1866–1949)
 James Palache (died 1918 in World War I)
 John Garber Palache
 Charles Palache (1869–1954)
 Alice Palache Jones (1907–1989)
 Mary Palache Gregory
 Judith Palache Gregory (1932–2017)
 Palatchi whose branches moved from Turkey to Spain or Latin America:
 Spain: Alberto Palatchi
 Argentina: Gabriel Palatchi

Holocaust victims

Listed in order of birth date:
 Henri Palacci/Palatchi (March 26, 1898–???), deported from Istanbul to France (1942) – seem to match details for Henriette Palatchi (26 March 1898 – 25 March 1943), deported to Sobibor and murdered.
 Isaac Palacci/Palatchi (April 15, 1900–???), deported from Istanbul to France (1942) – seems to match details for Henry Palatchi (15 April 1900 – 20 May 1944) murdered in Auschwitz.
 Mordecai Palatchi/Palacci (1903–1942), born in Bursa, Turkey and deported to Drancy internment camp, France – seems to match details for Mordehai Palatchi (1903–1942), murdered in Auschwitz.
 Sarah Palatchi (5 October 1904 – 30 June 1944), born Sarah Kabili in Salonika, Turkey, deported to Drancy internment camp, France, murdered in Auschwitz.
 David Palachi (3 April 1905 – 28 October 1943), born Constantine, Algeria, deported to Nice (Camp des Milles?), sent on Transport 61 on 28 October 1943 to Auschwitz and murdered.
 Jean Palatchi' (13 November 1926 – ???), deported to Drancy internment camp, France; survived the holocaust.

See also
 Pallache (surname)
 Samuel Pallache
 Joseph Pallache
 Moses Pallache
 David Pallache
 Isaac Pallache
 Haim Palachi
 Abraham Palacci
 Rahamim Nissim Palacci
 Joseph Palacci
 Isaac Juda Palache
 Juda Lion Palache
 Charles Palache
 Judith Palache Gregory
 Eddy Palacci
 Colette (Palacci) Rossant
 Cristina (singer) born Cristina Monet-Palaci, daughter of Jacques Palaci
 Alberto Palatchi
 Gabriel Palatchi
 Ladino
 Kemeraltı: Synagogues
 Sephardi Jews
 History of the Jews in Spain
 History of the Jews in Portugal
 Expulsion of the Jews from Spain
 Expulsion of Jews and Muslims from Portugal
 History of the Jews in Morocco
 History of the Jews in the Netherlands
 History of the Jews in Turkey
 History of the Jews in Egypt
 History of the Jews in Jamaica
 History of the Jews in England
 History of the Jews in Latin America and the Caribbean
 List of synagogues in Turkey
 List of Caribbean Jews
 Moïse Lévy de Benzion
 Cicurel family
 Moïse Rahmani

Notes

References

Jewish families
Sephardi rabbis
Sephardi families
Rabbis from the Ottoman Empire
16th-century rabbis
17th-century rabbis
18th-century rabbis
19th-century rabbis
20th-century rabbis
Exponents of Jewish law
Moroccan Jews
Dutch Sephardi Jews
Turkish Jews
People from Fez, Morocco
People from Amsterdam
People from İzmir
Businesspeople from Cairo
Moroccan businesspeople
Dutch businesspeople
Egyptian businesspeople
Egyptian Sephardi Jews
Moroccan pirates
Dutch pirates
Moroccan diplomats
17th-century Dutch diplomats
15th-century Castilians
15th-century Portuguese people
16th-century Moroccan people
16th-century Dutch people
17th-century Moroccan people
18th-century Moroccan people
18th-century Dutch people
19th-century Moroccan people
19th-century Dutch people
19th-century Egyptian people
20th-century Moroccan people
20th-century Dutch people
20th-century Turkish people
20th-century Egyptian people
Moroccan emigrants to the Netherlands
Moroccan emigrants to Turkey
Dutch emigrants to Turkey
Turkish emigrants to Egypt
Medieval Castilian Jews